Zodarion couseransense is a species of spider in the family Zodariidae, found in France.

See also
 List of Zodariidae species

References

External links

couseransense
Spiders of Europe
Spiders described in 1997